Ovalle is a city in the Coquimbo Region of Chile, founded in 1831 as a settlement. It has a population of more than 113,000 people. The name Ovalle was chosen to honor to Chile's vice-president, José Tomás Ovalle. Ovalle is the capital of the Limarí Province.

The city's setting is often likened to an oasis, being lush and green although surrounded by barren hills.

There is a trail leading from the city that lasts roughly 50 minutes, and features relatively safe bathing and an area where dinosaur fossils can be found. On the trail is a life-sized model of a brachiosaurus.

The town's football club is Deportes Ovalle. Famous players have played for the club, including 1982 FIFA World Cup player Rodolfo Dubó.

Demographics
Of these, 73,790 (75.2%) lived in urban areas and 24,299 (24.8%) in rural areas. The population grew by 15.4% (13,107 persons) between the 1992 and 2002 censuses.

Climate 
The climate is semi-desertic with subtropical influence, with long summers and short winters. Ovalle has hot and dry summers, with temperatures in the range 22–40°C, occasionally with temperatures above 43°C. Thunderstorms can hit the city in February and March, but this happens normally in the surrounding areas of Ovalle. Winters are humid and fresh, and is when rains occur. The temperatures in winter are generally lower than nearby cities like La Serena or Punitaqui, due to cold winds that come from the Andes through the Ovalle valley. Temperatures rarely fall below -5°C, but when polar waves affect the area, temperatures can drop down to -12°C.

Administration
As a commune, Ovalle is a third-level administrative division of Chile administered by a municipal council, headed by an alcalde who is directly elected every four years. The 2012-2016 alcalde is Claudio Rentería Larrondo.

Within the electoral divisions of Chile, Ovalle is represented in the Chamber of Deputies by Pedro Velásquez (Ind.) and Matías Walker (PDC) as part of the 8th electoral district, (together with Coquimbo and Río Hurtado). The commune is represented in the Senate by Gonzalo Uriarte (UDI) and Jorge Pizarro Soto (PDC) as part of the 4th senatorial constituency (Coquimbo Region).

Notable people 

The pediatrician and biochemist Hermann Niemeyer, one of the central figures in the development of biochemistry in Chile, was born in Ovalle in 1918. Elisa Berroeta was born in Ovalle and was a wood engraver and illustrator, active in Santiago and Paris.

Gallery

See also
Bosque de Fray Jorge National Park
Embalse La Paloma
Embalse Recoleta

References

External links

  Municipality of Ovalle
  Ovallito.cl

Populated places established in 1831
Communes of Chile
Populated places in Limarí Province
Capitals of Chilean provinces
1831 establishments in Chile